Wittner is a surname. Notable people with the surname include:

 Lawrence S. Wittner (born 1941), American historian
 Mária Wittner (1937–2022), Hungarian revolutionary and politician
 Markus Wittner (born 1973), Austrian freestyle skier
 Meg Wittner (born 1950), American actress